Isom Wright (July 1859 – August 17, 1941) was an American politician who served three terms in the Kansas House of Representatives as the Representative from the 79th and 82nd districts in Barton County, Kansas. 

Born in Putnam County, Indiana, he lived for 56 years in Barton County and Great Bend, Kansas. Wright, a farmer and teacher, was elected to the Kansas Legislature in 1896 and 1898, and served during the 17-day special session of the Kansas Legislature called by Governor John W. Leedy in December 1898 to address railroad charges. The session lasted from December 21, 1898, to January 9, 1899.   

1897–1899 Kansas House of Representatives Committee assignments: 
Claims and Accounts Committee
Judicial Apportionment Committee
Engrossed Bills Committee

1899–1901 Kansas House of Representatives Committee assignments: 
Legislative Apportionment Committee
Penal Institutions Committee
Cities of the Third Class Committee

References

1859 births
1941 deaths
Members of the Kansas House of Representatives
19th-century American politicians
People from Great Bend, Kansas
People from Putnam County, Indiana
Educators from Kansas